Laura Spencer may refer to:

 Laura Spencer (actress) (born 1986), American actress
 Laura Spencer (General Hospital), a fictional character in the television series General Hospital
 Laura Horton (formerly Spencer), a fictional character in the television series Days of Our Lives
 Laura Spencer-Churchill, Duchess of Marlborough (1915–1990), British noblewoman and socialite

See also
 Laura Spencer Portor Pope (1872–1957), American journalist and author
 Lara Spencer (born 1969), American television journalist